The 2019 Cavalry FC season was the first season in the club's history, as well as the first season in Canadian Premier League history.

Overview 
On May 17, 2018 Cavalry FC was unveiled as Calgary's team in the new  Canadian Premier League, with then Calgary Foothills FC head coach Tommy Wheeldon Jr. chosen to be the first head coach in Cavalry history. On November 29, 2018, Cavalry signed its first ever players: veteran Nik Ledgerwood and young talent Sergio Camargo, both from the Foothills. Overall, 12 of the players on the Cavalry squad came from the Foothills. Cavalry's first ever international signing was Brazilian striker Oliver Minatel. Cavalry signed two of its picks in the 2018 CPL–U Sports Draft, first overall pick Gabriel Bitar and fourteenth overall pick Joel Waterman.

On May 3, 2019 Cavalry played their first ever game, at home against York9 FC. Jordan Brown scored the first goal in Cavalry FC history, with Dominick Zator adding a second and Cavalry hanging on for a 2–1 victory. Cavalry went on to win their first seven games, until succumbing to Forge FC in a 1–0 defeat. However, Cavalry rebounded and defeated York9 2–0 in their next game, clinching the spring season title and a berth in the 2019 Canadian Premier League Finals.

In the Canadian Championship, Cavalry faced Pacific FC in the first round and won both legs. Next, they were up against Forge. In the first leg in Hamilton, Forge struck first, but there was late drama when Forge FC goalkeeper Quillan Roberts received a red card in stoppage time, with no substitutions remaining. Cavalry was given a penalty shot, and Dominique Malonga beat midfielder turned goalkeeper Alexander Achinioti-Jönsson to tie the game. Tensions were high after the goal, and Cavalry players accused a member of Forge's coaching staff of making racist remarks. The match ended with a melee between Cavalry and Forge players, establishing a rivalry that would continue to take shape for the rest of the season. In the second leg, Forge opened the scoring again, but goals from Malonga and Camargo meant that it was Cavalry who advanced to the quarterfinals. Cavalry faced MLS club Vancouver Whitecaps FC in the quarterfinals and in the first leg the Cavs held the Whitecaps to a 0–0 draw at home. In the second leg at BC Place in Vancouver, Brown and Zator scored in a 2–1 victory and goalkeeper Marco Carducci, who used to play for the Whitecaps, was praised for his performance. Cavalry became the first CPL team to defeat an MLS team, and advanced to the semifinals, where they were awaited by the Montreal Impact. In the first leg of the semifinals, Ignacio Piatti scored twice for the Impact, but Cavalry was given hope when Camargo scored later in the game. It was not meant to be, however, as Cavalry couldn't get another one and Ledgerwood received a second yellow card, forcing Cavalry to play the last part of the game with 10 men. A 1–0 defeat back in Calgary ended the Cinderella story and the Impact ended up defeating Toronto FC in the finals to become the champions.

Although Cavalry was already secured a spot in the CPL finals, they won the fall season as well, causing Forge FC to qualify as the other finalist on the basis of having the next best overall record. In the first leg of the finals in Hamilton, Waterman was given a red card and Forge star and CPL top scorer  Tristan Borges was given a penalty kick, but it was stopped by Carducci. However, Borges scored ten minutes later and the game ended at 1–0. Neither team could score in the second leg, until in stoppage time when all of Cavalry's outfield players were pressing in the attacking zone, and Forge managed to break out. David Choinière managed to score on the resulting 2 on 0, securing Cavalry's fate as runners up.

Over the course of the season,  Carducci and Zator were called up to the Canada men's national soccer team once each, but neither saw action. Carducci was the first Canadian Premier League player to be called up to the national team.

Despite losing in the finals, Cavalry finished first overall in the regular season, and Wheeldon Jr. stated that he would like to bring most of the players back for the next season. Wheeldon Jr. was named coach of the year, and Carducci was named best goalkeeper and Volkswagen Premier Performer, while Malonga was nominated for best player.

Squad
As of November 2, 2019.

Transfers

In

Draft picks 
Cavalry FC selected the following players in the 2018 CPL–U Sports Draft on November 12, 2018. Draft picks are not automatically signed to the team roster. Only those who are signed to a contract will be listed as transfers in.

Out

Competitions 
Match times are Mountain Daylight Time (UTC−6).

Preseason

Canadian Premier League

Spring season

League table

Results summary

Results by match

Matches

Fall season

League table

Results summary

Results by match

Matches

CPL Finals

Canadian Championship

First qualifying round

Second qualifying round

Third qualifying round

Semi-finals

Statistics

Squad and statistics 

|-

 

|-
|colspan="14"|Players who left during the season:

|}

Top scorers 
{| class="wikitable sortable alternance"  style="font-size:85%; text-align:center; line-height:14px; width:85%;"
|-
!width=10|Rank
!width=10|Nat.
! scope="col" style="width:275px;"|Player
!width=10|Pos.
!width=80|CPL Spring season
!width=80|CPL Fall season
!width=80|CPL Finals
!width=80|Canadian Championship
!width=80|TOTAL
|-
|1|||| Dominique Malonga      || FW || 4 || 7 || 0 || 2 ||13
|-
|rowspan=2|2|||| Sergio Camargo        || MF || 3 || 3 || 0 || 2 ||8
|-
||| Oliver Minatel        || FW || 0 || 7 || 0 || 1 ||8
|-
|4|||| Julian Büscher        || MF || 1 || 4 || 0 || 1 ||6
|-
|rowspan=2|5|||| Jordan Brown        || FW || 2 || 2 || 0 || 1 ||5
|-
||| Nico Pasquotti        || MF || 2 || 3 || 0 || 0 ||5
|-
|7|||| José Escalante        || MF || 1 || 3 || 0 || 0 ||4
|-
|rowspan=2|8|||| Nik Ledgerwood        || MF || 1 || 2 || 0 || 0 ||3
|-
||| Dominick Zator        || DF || 1 || 0 || 0 || 2 ||3
|-
|rowspan=2|10|||| Elijah Adekugbe        || MF || 0 || 1 || 0 || 0 ||1
|-
||| Joel Waterman        || DF || 0 || 1 || 0 || 0 ||1
|-
|colspan="4"|Own goals      || 1 || 2 || 0 || 1 || 4
|-
|- class="sortbottom"
| colspan="4"|Totals||16||35||0||10||61

Top assists 
{| class="wikitable sortable alternance"  style="font-size:85%; text-align:center; line-height:14px; width:85%;"
|-
!width=10|Rank
!width=10|Nat.
! scope="col" style="width:275px;"|Player
!width=10|Pos.
!width=80|CPL Spring season
!width=80|CPL Fall season
!width=80|CPL Finals
!width=80|Canadian Championship
!width=80|TOTAL
|-
|rowspan=2|1|||| José Escalante  || MF || 1 || 3 || 0 || 2 ||6
|-
||| Nico Pasquotti        || MF || 1 || 2 || 0 || 3 ||6
|-
|rowspan=2|3|||| Elijah Adekugbe  || MF || 3 || 1 || 0 || 0 ||4
|-
||| Julian Büscher        || MF || 0 || 4 || 0 || 0 ||4
|-
|rowspan=3|5|||| Sergio Camargo        || MF || 0 || 3 || 0 || 0 ||3
|-
||| Malyk Hamilton        || MF || 0 || 2 || 0 || 1 ||3
|-
||| Dominick Zator        || DF || 0 || 3 || 0 || 0 ||3
|-
|rowspan=2|8|||| Dominique Malonga          || FW || 1 || 0 || 0 || 1 ||2
|-
||| Joel Waterman        || DF || 1 || 1 || 0 || 0 ||2
|-
|rowspan=5|10|||| Jordan Brown        || FW || 0 || 1 || 0 || 0 ||1
|-
||| Nik Ledgerwood        || MF || 0 || 0 || 0 || 1 ||1
|-
||| Nathan Mavila        || DF || 0 || 1 || 0 || 0 ||1
|-
||| Oliver Minatel        || FW || 0 || 1 || 0 || 0 ||1
|-
||| Carlos Patiño        || MF || 0 || 1 || 0 || 0 ||1
|-
|- class="sortbottom"
| colspan="4"|Totals||7||23||0||8||38

Clean sheets 
{| class="wikitable sortable alternance"  style="font-size:85%; text-align:center; line-height:14px; width:85%;"
|-
!width=10|Rank
!width=10|Nat.
! scope="col" style="width:275px;"|Player
!width=80|CPL Spring season
!width=80|CPL Fall season
!width=80|CPL Finals
!width=80|Canadian Championship
!width=80|TOTAL
|-
|1|||| Marco Carducci        || 5 || 4 || 0 || 1 ||10
|-
|2|||| Niko Giantsopoulos  || 0 || 3 || 0 || 1 ||4
|-
|- class="sortbottom"
| colspan="3"|Totals||5||7||0||2||14

Disciplinary record 
{| class="wikitable sortable alternance"  style="font-size:85%; text-align:center; line-height:14px; width:85%;"
|-
!rowspan="2" width=10|No.
!rowspan="2" width=10|Pos.
!rowspan="2" width=10|Nat.
!rowspan="2" scope="col" style="width:275px;"|Player
!colspan="2" width=80|CPL Spring season
!colspan="2" width=80|CPL Fall season
!colspan="2" width=80|CPL Finals
!colspan="2" width=80|Canadian Championship
!colspan="2" width=80|TOTAL
|-
! !!  !!  !!  !!  !!  !!  !!  !!  !! 
|-
|1||GK|||| Marco Carducci    ||0||0||1||0||0||0||0||0||1||0
|-
|3||DF|||| Nathan Mavila    ||1||0||1||1||0||0||3||0||5||1
|-
|5||DF|||| Mason Trafford    ||0||0||1||0||1||0||0||0||2||0
|-
|6||MF|||| Nik Ledgerwood    ||0||0||2||0||2||0||1||1||5||1
|-
|7||FW|||| Oliver Minatel    ||1||0||2||0||1||0||0||0||4||0
|-
|8||MF|||| Julian Büscher    ||3||0||2||0||0||0||0||0||5||0
|-
|9||FW|||| Jordan Brown    ||0||0||2||0||0||0||0||0||2||0
|-
|10||MF|||| Sergio Camargo    ||1||0||0||0||0||0||0||0||1||0
|-
|11||MF|||| José Escalante    ||0||0||2||1||1||0||2||0||5||1
|-
|12||DF|||| Dean Northover    ||2||1||0||0||0||0||1||0||3||1
|-
|13||MF|||| Victor Loturi    ||1||0||0||0||0||0||0||0||1||0
|-
|14||DF|||| Jonathan Wheeldon    ||3||0||1||0||2||0||1||0||7||0
|-
|15||DF|||| Joel Waterman    ||3||0||1||0||0||1||1||0||5||1
|-
|16||MF|||| Elijah Adekugbe    ||3||0||3||0||0||0||1||0||7||0
|-
|17||MF|||| Nico Pasquotti    ||2||0||3||0||1||0||0||0||6||0
|-
|18||MF|||| Mauro Eustáquio    ||1||1||1||0||0||0||0||0||2||1
|-
|21||MF|||| Malyk Hamilton    ||0||0||1||0||0||0||0||0||1||0
|-
|22||GK|||| Niko Giantsopoulos    ||0||0||0||0||0||0||1||0||1||0
|-
|23||FW|||| Dominique Malonga    ||1||0||0||0||0||0||0||0||1||0
|-
|- class="sortbottom"
| colspan="4"|Totals||22||2||23||2||8||1||11||1||64||6

Honours

References

External links 
2019 Cavalry FC season at Official Site

Cavalry FC seasons
Cavalry FC
CAV
Cavalry FC